Edward Ferguson Gilbert (born March 12, 1952) is a Canadian former professional ice hockey forward who played 166 games in the National Hockey League for the Kansas City Scouts and Pittsburgh Penguins. He also played 29 games in the World Hockey Association for the Cincinnati Stingers.

Career statistics

References

External links
 

1952 births
Living people
Canadian ice hockey centres
Cincinnati Stingers players
Hamilton Red Wings (OHA) players
Hershey Bears players
Ice hockey people from Ontario
Sportspeople from Hamilton, Ontario
Kansas City Scouts players
Montreal Canadiens draft picks
Nova Scotia Voyageurs players
Pittsburgh Penguins players